WWWK (105.5 FM) is a radio station broadcasting a Spanish Variety format. Licensed to Islamorada, Florida, United States, the station serves the Florida Keys area.  The station is currently owned by Lsm Radio Partners LLC.

History
The station was assigned the call letters WPLC on March 2, 1984.  On December 1, 1986, the station changed its call sign to WAVK then on October 23, 2003, to the current WWWK.

See also
Rumbera Network in Venezuela (Spanish)

References

External links

WWK
Radio stations established in 1984
1984 establishments in Florida